Fraccionamiento Camino Maldonado is a suburb of Pando. It is composed of two fragments, one at the northeast and one at the southwest of Barros Blancos. The three together form a southwestern extension of the urban area of Pando, and they all belong to the wider metropolitan area of Montevideo.

Population
In 2004, the two fragments had a population of 15,057.
 
Source: Instituto Nacional de Estadística de Uruguay

At the 2011 census, no separate population was given for these fragments. Instead the new population number given for Barros Blancos seems to have incorporated their population.

Coordinates of fragments
 Northeast fragment: 
 Southwest fragment:

References

External links
INE map of Juan Antonio Artigas (Barros Blancos) and the two populated fragments of Camino Maldonado 

Populated places in the Canelones Department